Philip Chan Siu Kwan  (born 1 August 1992 in Hong Kong) is a Hong Kong professional footballer who currently plays for Hong Kong Premier League club Resources Capital. He is primarily a central midfielder who can also play in the full back position.

Early life
Chan trained with Brazilian team Gremio when he was 14 and joined the youth academy in 2006. 

He graduated from University of Hong Kong in 2016, majoring in Exercise and Health.

Club career

In 2011, along with his club Sham Shui Po's promotion to the Hong Kong First Division, he started playing as a professional player. On 8 January 2012, Chan was sent off in the match against Hong Kong Sapling after receiving two yellow cards. Towards the end of the 2012 season he has established himself as a hard-tackling defensive midfielder.

After returning from a short training period with mainland Chinese side Guangzhou R&F, Chan returned to Hong Kong and joined Yokohama FC Hong Kong in summer of 2012.

In June 2013, Chan completed a transfer to Hong Kong giants South China and was handed the number 16 shirt. 

On 18 July 2017, Chan joined Eastern after South China's decision to self-relegate. On 4 January 2018, he was loaned to Southern for the remainder of the 2017-18 season.

On 19 July 2018, Eastern chairman Peter Leung confirmed that Chan had been transferred to Hong Kong Premier League club Tai Po.

On 1 July 2019, Chan returned to Southern.

On 2 March 2021, Chan joined Rangers.

On 29 September 2021, Chan joined Kitchee.

On 1 July 2022, Chan left Kitchee.

On 24 January 2023, Chan joined Resources Capital. He instantly found his place in the first team and played full 90 minutes in his second and thirds HKPL match for the club against HKFC and Shum Shui Po respectively.

International career

Hong Kong U21
Chan is a member of the Hong Kong under-21 national football team. On 15 November 2011, he scored the equalising goal against Russia under-19 national football team in the game that celebrated Mong Kok Stadium's re-opening after renovation, but Hong Kong U21 lost 1–2 in the end. Chan received his first call up for the Hong Kong senior team in July 2012 by new coach Ernie Merrick against Singapore but he failed to make a debut.

Hong Kong
On 11 June 2019, Chan made his international debut for the Hong Kong national football team in a friendly match against Chinese Taipei.

Club Statistics

Club

As of 19 May 2021

International

International goals

Honours

Club
Tai Po
 Hong Kong Premier League: 2018–19

Individual
 Best Youth Player: 2014–15

Personal life
Chan's father Chan Pak Hung was the Hong Kong Jockey Champion in the 1986/1987 racing season and previously worked as a horse trainer for both the Hong Kong Jockey Club and the Macau Jockey Club. Chan also studied at Hong Lok Yuen International School and French International School in Hong Kong. He also completed International Baccalaureate at South Island School.  He then completed his degree in Sports Science at the University of Hong Kong and graduated in 2016.

References

External links 
 
 

1992 births
Living people
Hong Kong footballers
Association football midfielders
Hong Kong First Division League players
Hong Kong Premier League players
Sham Shui Po SA players
South China AA players
Eastern Sports Club footballers
Southern District FC players
Tai Po FC players
Hong Kong Rangers FC players
Kitchee SC players
Resources Capital FC players
Hong Kong international footballers
Footballers at the 2014 Asian Games
Asian Games competitors for Hong Kong
Alumni of the University of Hong Kong